The 1984 UK & Ireland Greyhound Racing Year was the 58th year of greyhound racing in the United Kingdom and Ireland.

Roll of honour

Summary
The year was dominated by the closure of greyhound racing's flagship stadium White City. It signified one of the lowest moments in the history of greyhound racing. The 1969 option granted to Stock Conversion and Investment Ltd for development finally became a reality. The final meeting was held on 22 September where Hastings Girl trained by Tommy Foster won the final race. The last White City Derby was won by Whisper Wishes before the event switched to Wimbledon, despite calls for it to go to Wembley. The company that introduced greyhound racing to Britain, (the Greyhound Racing Association) came under severe criticism.

The National Greyhound Racing Club (NGRC) released the annual returns, with totalisator turnover slightly down at £59,382,835 and attendances also slightly down recorded at 3,942,344 from 5191 meetings. Track tote remained at 17.5% and government tote tax at 4%.

Whisper Wishes, a black dog was voted Greyhound of the Year. after winning the Derby at White City. 1984 Greyhound of the Year Yankee Express trained by George Curtis won a third successive Scurry Gold Cup title.

Competitions
The White City events switched to new tracks, in addition to receiving the Derby, Wimbledon would host the Springbok and the English Greyhound Derby Invitation. The Grand National went to Hall Green but the Longcross Cup and Wood Lane Stakes was discontinued.

Tracks
Walthamstow would take over the mantle as the leading track, as shown by the final of the Grand Prix. A crowd of more than 5,000 watched  Sunrise Sonny win the race. Over one million tote units were sold, the highest recorded figure since 1945. 

Overshadowed by the closure of White City was the closure of three other tracks, on the 14 April both Cambridge and Perry Barr closed and Leicester ran its final meeting on 15 August after 56 years operating at Blackbird Road. It was sold by their owners Midland Sports to Barratts homes for new housing which left just Coventry operating under the name of Midland Sports. Mick Wheble who held the position of Racing Manager at Leicester and Coventry moved to take over at Oxford where Jim Layton had left for Brighton. Coventry recruited a young Racing Manager in Sean Doyle, son of trainer Paddy Doyle but Sean's career would be cut short when he died from cancer.   

Independent tracks Brean Sands and Blackburn both closed but Ashington in Northumberland re-opened. Northern Sports opened their new state of the art 200 seated grandstand restaurant and leisure facilities including squash and snooker clubs at Dumpton Park, Ramsgate. Brough Park was sold to Bernard Neesham who stopped trainers from supplying greyhounds to neighbour Gosforth.

News
White City trainers Tom Foster and David Kinchett joined Wimbledon and Ray Peacock went to Harringay Stadium. Frank Baldwin, Frank Melville, Graham Mann and Richard Griffin were left without a track.  

A black greyhound called Scurlogue Champ, whelped in July 1982 arrived in England after initially being sold at the Shelbourne Park sales and then on to owner/trainer Ken Peckham for £1700. He had an odd running style in that he would often be outpaced early before finishing with remarkable strength. From September he broke four long-distance track records at Ipswich, Catford, Harringay and Hall Green. Another greyhound called Ballyregan Bob won his first race on 25 October 1984.

Ireland
Ger McKenna won a twelfth Irish St Leger and a fifth Irish Laurels.

Principal UK races

Totalisator returns

The totalisator returns declared to the National Greyhound Racing Club for the year 1984 are listed below.

References 

Greyhound racing in the United Kingdom
Greyhound racing in the Republic of Ireland
UK and Ireland Greyhound Racing Year
UK and Ireland Greyhound Racing Year
UK and Ireland Greyhound Racing Year
UK and Ireland Greyhound Racing Year